is a children's picture book which is written by Ahn Masako and published by Kodansha on 2018. An anime television series adaptation produced by Shirogumi aired from April 3, 2021 to March 26, 2022.

Plot
This is a story where sushi become sumo wrestlers. Each sushi will use their own ingredient to unleash their own techniques. The strongest ingredient has major advantage to win this sumo wrestling.

Cast
Yobidashi Gari

Oyakata Nasubi

Kaisetsusha Ocha

Oyakata Takenoko

Gyouji Wasabi

Media

Book

Anime

See also
 Pui Pui Molcar
 iii icecrin

Notes

References

External links
  
 

Anime with original screenplays
Shirogumi
Medialink